Greg Smith (born 30 October 1971) is an English-South African former cricketer. He played as a right-handed batsman and a left-arm medium-fast bowler.

Born in Pretoria, but with dual-nationality through his English father, Smith made his Nottinghamshire debut in 2001. In 2005 he aided Nottinghamshire towards the County Championship, taking 51 wickets.

References

External links
Greg Smith at ECB

1971 births
Living people
South African cricketers
Nottinghamshire cricketers
Northerns cricketers